Baxter Edwards Perry (April 26, 1826 – August 29, 1906) was a Massachusetts attorney and politician. Perry served in the Massachusetts House of Representatives and as the second Mayor of Medford, Massachusetts.

Career as an attorney
Perry began the practice of law in Boston in May 1855.  Perry was disbarred in 1897.

He died in 1906.

See also
 1877 Massachusetts legislature

References
 Bacon, Edwin Monroe: Boston of To-Day: a Glance at its History and Characteristics. p. 346, (1892).
Davis, William Thomas: "Bench and Bar of the Commonwealth of Massachusetts, Volume I."  p. 474, (1895).

Notes

People from Lyme, New Hampshire
1826 births
1906 deaths
Mayors of Medford, Massachusetts
Republican Party members of the Massachusetts House of Representatives
19th-century American politicians